is a temple of Shingon Buddhism in Onomichi, Hiroshima Prefecture, Japan. As a site sacred to the boddhisattva Kannon, it is the 9th temple on the Chūgoku 33 Kannon Pilgrimage. The temple, built at the end of the Kamakura period, is noted for two national treasures: the temple's main hall (hondō) and the treasure pagoda (tahōtō). In addition it holds a number of Important Cultural Property structures and artworks.

History 
Prince Shōtoku is said to have been the founder of the temple. It is certain that there has been a place of prayer at the site since the end of the Heian period. The actual construction took place from 1306 with the construction of the main hall (hon-dō). But as early as 1325 the temple burnt down. Shortly thereafter the most important buildings were rebuilt with the help of the population. An Eleven-faced Goddess of Mercy is worshiped at the temple.

During the Nanboku-chō period, Ashikaga Takauji visited the temple on the way from Kyūshū  in 1336 and donated a collection of 33 poems thanking for military success. The collection is still in the possession of the temple and is registered as Japanese Important Cultural Property. Takauji made Jōdo-ji one of the temples for national pacification.

Temple compound 
The temple buildings are located halfway up a hill on a plaza stretching East-West from where there is a view on the Inland Sea. The sanmon dates to 	1333–1392 and has been designated as Important Cultural Property (ICP). Its kaerumata, frog leg struts, have been decorated with the family crest of the Ashikaga clan.

Built by the carpenter  in 1327 in the Japanese style (wayō) and later—with the addition of a front porch—adapted to the Zen style, it has been designated as National Treasure. The hall is a 5×5 ken, single-storied, irimoya style structure with a 1 ken step canopy, hongawarabuki roof.

This hall, dedicated to Amida,  "The Buddha of Immeasurable Life and Light" who rules over the Western Paradis or the Pure land was built in 1345. A seated image of Amida Nyōrai is enshrined in this building.

It enshrines an image of Dainichi Nyorai with attendants. The interior walls are painted with images of the Eight Patriarchs of Shingon Buddhism. During reconstruction works in 1936, many sutra scrolls and other items were discovered in the roof's finial (sōrin). Unlike the Main Hall and the Amida Hall which are aligned in east-westerly direction, the treasure pagoda is moved a bit south into the plaza, positioning it to the south-east of the Amida Hall.

A number of service buildings occupies the western end of the temple precinct.

From the center of the garden a cascade drops down ending in a small pond. It was donated in 1814 by the Tomishima family, a wealthy merchant family from Mukaishima across the strait. According to unconfirmed history, this tea house was originally found inside Fushimi Castle from where it was moved to Hongan-ji, Kyoto until it was disassembled in the late 16th/early 17th century and became property of the Tomishima family. Roteki-an is a single-storied, irimoya style structure with thatched roof. Inside it has a three-mat space for guests and a temaeza (seat for host) in the daime style (3/4 mat). There is a (shōbanseki, 相伴席) mat for additional or special guests.

It is a double-storied kirizuma style structure,   in size with hongawarabuki roof and dates to 1759.

They were built in 1719. The kuri is entered from its prominent gable facade (tsumairi) which opens towards the main plaza. Kuri were originally primarily used for food preparation but came to contain administrative and living quarters of the monks. The kuri is a  kirizuma style structure. The kyakuden encircles a small courtyard. The eastern wing, in yosemune style runs in north-south direction and contains the drawing or guest rooms. It measures  and has an attached entranceway facing the plaza in the east. The western wing is  kirizuma style. A living room is found in the  southern wing and a tea room in the  northern wing which is in the kirizuma style. All parts have hongawarabuki roofs except for the northern wing and a small two-storied structure in the western wing which have sangawarabuki tile roofs.

There is a small Japanese rock garden surrounded by the kyakuden to the west, the hōjō to the north, the hōn-dō to the east and by a wall with a  gate to the south. This gate, made entirely of Japanese elm is a small 1×1 ken structure with hongawarabuki roof and dates to 1712. It was relocated in 1719 from its original position between the Main Hall and the Amida Hall.

Stone pagodas
There are three notable stone pagodas, designated as Important Cultural Property, found on the temple grounds: one  and two in the  style. It was built in the 10th month of 1278 by Kōa Yoshichika, as a memorial tower for his father, a wealthy Onomichi businessman. Inside the pagoda various holy scriptures were deposited as offering, such as the Lotus Sutra, The Three Pure Land Sutras and the Brahmajala Sutra.

It was erected on the 1st day of the 10th month, 1348 to commemorate among others the monk  and Emperor Kōkō.

Another hōkyōintō, from the Nanboku-chō period (1333–1392) known as "tomb of Ashikaga Takauji", is found at the southern wall of the temple grounds.  tall, this tower shows particularly fine carving work.

Notable Treasures
The  holds a number of Buddhist sculptures, paintings , crafts articles and written materials, some of which have been designated as Important Cultural Properties.

Sculptures
The principal image of the temple is a 9th century early Heian period standing sculpture of the Eleven-faced Goddess of Mercy made of colored hinoki wood and designated as Important Cultural Property. Its right hand is bestowing the gift of fearlessness (abhayadāna) while a vase is placed in the left hand.

Three Shōtoku sculptures from the Kamakura and Nanboku-chō periods have been designated as Important Cultural Properties. Each of the three is made of several pieces of wood in the yoseki-zukuri style. They are all colored, have crystal eyes (玉眼, gyokugan) and are housed in the temple's treasure hall. Inside of the statues ink inscriptions were found informing of the date and circumstance of the works.

According to tradition it shows Shōtoku at the age of 16 years. It is said to have been made by the Buddhist novice  on occasion of his son's death.

He is wearing a red ancient skirt (裳) with the upper part of the body naked. Like the "filial piety"-Shōtoku it is a work of the Kyoto sculptor 院憲.

Unlike other regent statues where a ritual baton (shaku) is held by both hands, here Shōtoku has the shaku in his right hand while an incense burner is placed in the left hand.

Paintings

The temple's treasure hall houses two Important Cultural Properties in the painting category. One is a Nirvana painting  from 1274 depicting the historical Buddha on his deathbed surrounded by mourners and animals. The painting is executed with colour on silk and measures . Scenes from the life of the Buddha are drawn in 16 panels along the left, bottom and right border of the painting.

The  is a set of two mandalas painted on silk depicting the Diamond and Womb Realm respectively. The work has an inscription in ink dating it to the year 1317.

Crafts
Jōdo-ji owns two notable and similar sutra boxes from 1315, differing in size, originating from China and designated as Important Cultural Properties. The  came into the possession of Jōdo-ji in 1358 to hold a copy of the Golden Light Sutra as translated into Chinese by the monk I Ching. Covered on the inside with red lacquer and outside black lacquer, the lid contains the character 首 ("head") and the body the character 性. This box has dimensions . It is in custody of the Nara National Museum.

The second, larger  has dimensions  but is otherwise similar in design. On the sides of the body of the box are a pair of peacock and a pair of Onagadori, long-tailed chicken. The cover contains the character 天 on the front and 性, 静, 情, 逸 engraved in the four corners.

Writings
The temple's treasure hall holds four notable articles of written materials designated as Important Cultural Properties. The oldest of these is a copy of volume 7 of the
 an example of a mid-Heian period ornamental sutra. Initially it alternates between columns in gold and silver paint while the latter part is written in gold only. At the end of the  scroll the date of completion is given as 22nd day of the 6th month, 949.

The document contains a vermillion handprint by Jōshō.

During the Kenmu era, Ashikaga Takauji, on the way to Kyushu stopped at Jōdo-ji to pray for military success at the temple's Kannon Bodhisattva. Later, on the 5th day of the 5th month, 1336, on the way back to Kyoto, he stopped by again and together with five of his sons had this scroll offered to the Eleven-faced goddess of mercy, the principal object of worship of Jōdo-ji. Seven of the poems are by Ashikaga Takauji and the scroll also contains Takauji's signature.

The treasure known as  consists of 11 ancient documents from the 14th century Nanboku-chō period and the first half of the 15th century Muromachi period. The documents deal with the temple's annual tribute and contain among others a donation letter by Ashikaga Takauji and the seal of Ashikaga Yoshinori. A related set of 104 documents has been designated as Prefectural Important Cultural Property.

In popular culture 
In the 1953 movie Tokyo Story directed by Yasujirō Ozu, the temple is prominently featured as a place near the residence of the elderly couple, Shūkichi and Tomi. The view from
Jōdo-ji is shown and remarked at in the movie and it also appears in other scenes. Tomi's funeral is at Jōdo-ji.

See also 
 List of National Treasures of Japan (temples)

Notes

References

External links 
Jōdo-ji homepage
Hiroshima Prefecture Cultural Properties
Panoramic view of the temple

Buddhist temples in Hiroshima Prefecture
Prince Shōtoku